George Garner (April 16, 1892 – January 8, 1971) was an American vocalist and choral director. He was the first African American to solo at the Chicago Symphony Orchestra. He was also the first African-American lead in a production at the Pasadena Playhouse in Pasadena, California.

Selected credits

Theatre

References

External links
 Rediscovering George Garner, March 5, 1930 in the Los Angeles Times

1892 births
1971 deaths
African-American male actors
Male actors from Chicago
20th-century American male actors
20th-century African-American male singers